WZBC (90.3 FM) is a radio station  broadcasting an Alternative format. Licensed to Newton, Massachusetts, United States, the station serves Boston and its western suburbs. The station is currently owned by Boston College.

While the station is run solely by students, much of the on-air staff is made up of members of the surrounding Boston community.
  The station broadcasts alternative and indie rock during the day, and then branches out to more diverse styles (ranging from funk to lounge to Middle Eastern) in the early evening. At night, the station focuses on experimental music, which it calls No Commercial Potential. WZBC is located in Chestnut Hill, Massachusetts at the corner of Beacon and Hammond on Boston College's main campus. WZBC also broadcasts sports for the Boston College Eagles, including basketball, football, hockey, baseball, and softball. There are also a few public affairs and news shows, including the syndicated Democracy Now! at noon weekdays and several hours of WZBC produced shows on the weekends.

History
Founded as WVBC, "The Voice of Boston College", the radio station began in 1960 as a carrier-current AM station, broadcasting solely to the university community through the electrical wiring of on-campus buildings and dormitories. After operating in this capacity for 13 years, Boston College applied for and was granted a license to operate WZBC, a 17-watt station which aired a wide range of music, from folk to country to rock. With the advent of WZBC, the radio station expanded its listenership and began serving school's neighboring community.

WZBC has seen tremendous growth since its inception in 1974. The station was granted a power increase in 1975, bringing the station's output to 1,000 watts, allowing for further expansion of its listenership. Another important change took place in 1979, when the station started broadcasting in stereo. The first stereo broadcast was officially marked by a guest appearance by British radio DJ John Peel. Perhaps the most important change in WZBC history occurred shortly after the switch to stereo, when the station narrowed its rock format to the genre known as modern rock, playing new bands which, for the most part, commercial radio would not touch, often because they were unmarketable. At approximately the same time, WZBC also began broadcasting more experimental music under the moniker No Commercial Potential.

In addition to the FM station, there is also WVBC-AM—staffed solely by students. The current WVBC can be streamed online. Additionally, the signal is broadcast over the BC cable television system, Channel 47.

In 1990, WZBC was profiled in Rolling Stone magazine and was named one of the country's top 10 college radio stations that year.

When rock band Nirvana released its breakthrough album Nevermind on Tuesday, September 24, 1991, the group was in Boston that day. Band members Dave Grohl and Krist Novoselic stopped by WZBC and were interviewed on the air. Tracks from the new album were played and tickets were given away to listeners for a newly announced all-ages show that night at the since-closed Axis nightclub.

Although WZBC is best known for its music programming, a number of its former sports announcers have gone on to have successful professional careers in sportscasting.

Notable alumni
 Brian Carpenter, musician
Brian Coleman, Check the Technique author
Gerard Cosloy, record label empresario
Valerie Forgione, Mistle Thrush vocalist
Fred Giannelli, musician
Maura Johnston, writer, music critic, and Boston College journalism adjunct professor.
Jim McKay, writer, director, producer of film and TV
Jon Rish, sports announcer
R. T. Rybak, mayor of Minneapolis, 2002–2014
Herb Scannell, media mogul and businessman
Jon Sciambi, sports announcer
Dave Smalley, punk vocalist
Joe Tessitore, sports announcer
Bob Wischusen, sports announcer

References

External links
WZBC web site
Playlists
Audio archive
WZBC's YouTube channel
Nirvana at WZBC, 24 Sept. 1991 (YouTube)
"Sound bites" - A March 2013 audio slideshow by Boston College Magazine featuring WZBC music programming and personalities
Creativity rules at WZBC; Campus station attracts diverse DJs

WVBC

Boston College
ZBC
Freeform radio stations
Radio stations established in 1974
ZBC
Softball mass media
Newton, Massachusetts
Mass media in Middlesex County, Massachusetts
1974 establishments in Massachusetts